Parkwood Elementary School may refer to:

 Parkwood Elementary School, a school in the Beavercreek City School District 
 Parkwood Heights Elementary School